If Memory Serves Us Well is an album by post-punk band Death of Samantha, released on December 3, 2013 by St. Valentine Records. It comprises re-recordings of previously released Death of Samantha tracks.

Track listing

Personnel 
Adapted from the If Memory Serves Us Well liner notes.

Death of Samantha
 Doug Gillard – guitar, backing vocals
 David James – bass guitar, backing vocals
 John Petkovic – lead vocals, guitar, clarinet
 Steve-O – drums

Production and additional personnel
 Death of Samantha – production, mixing
 Paul Gold – mastering
 Travis Harrison – mixing
 Michael Seifert – recording
 Craig Semetko – photography

Release history

External links

References 

2013 albums
Death of Samantha albums
Homestead Records albums